DXRJ (1476 AM) was a radio station owned and operated by Rajah Broadcasting Network through its licensee Free Air Broadcasting Network, Inc. Its studio and transmitter were located along National Highway, Brgy. Santa Filomena, Iligan City. It aired Voice of America during late nights. It is off the air since late 2013.

References

Radio stations in Iligan
Radio stations established in 1986
Radio stations disestablished in 2013
News and talk radio stations in the Philippines
Defunct radio stations in the Philippines